Take It or Leave It is a 1944 American musical-comedy film directed by Benjamin Stoloff and written by Mac Benoff, Harold Buchman, and Snag Werris. It was the screen version of the popular radio quiz show of the same name, whose main feature was "the $64 question." Master of ceremonies Phil Baker played himself in the movie.

Plot
Sailor Eddie Collins (Edward Ryan) needs $1,000 to pay his wife's obstetrician. He is selected as a contestant on a special edition of Take It or Leave It, and works his way up to the top prize of $64. Emcee Phil Baker, sympathetic to the sailor's plight, allows him to earn more money by asking additional $64 questions.

Production and reception
Take It or Leave It was produced on an exceptionally low budget for a major-studio motion picture. Twentieth Century-Fox producer Bryan Foy economized by casting inexpensive juveniles in principal roles (Edward Ryan, Marjorie Massow—later Madge Meredith—and Stanley Prager), with only a few character players in support and bit roles. The only then-current star was Phil Silvers, who appeared briefly in a pre-credits prologue explaining the film's premise.

Bryan Foy slashed the budget even more by inserting entire chunks of old Fox movies into the narrative. Most of the film has Phil Baker asking contestant Edward Ryan questions about famous motion pictures of the past, and each question is accompanied by a production number shown on a screen. Thus Shirley Temple, Alice Faye, Betty Grable, Buster Keaton, Al Jolson, The Ritz Brothers, and other Fox stars make appearances.

Although three screenwriters are credited, the storyline is very slight. The three writers were really radio jokesmiths, hired to supply star Phil Baker with a running repertoire of puns and one-liners appropriate to each quiz question.

The film was released on July 7, 1944. Fox did not publicize the star names in the cast, leaving the audience to play along with the quiz game and be surprised by the film clips. It was a shrewd strategy and a daring gamble, since such a mixture of old and new film footage was unprecedented. Movie trade papers were wary of the film's chances, and wondered whether audiences might feel cheated at having paid admission for a new film, only to be shown mostly old footage. But the film's audience-participation gimmick worked in the film's favor, and theater owners reported enthusiastic crowds. The film ultimately earned one million dollars.

Cast   
Phil Baker as himself
Edward Ryan as Eddie Collins
Madge Meredith as Kate Collins 
Stanley Prager as Herb Gordon
Roy Gordon as Doctor Edward Preston
Nana Bryant as Miss Burke
Carleton Young as Program Director
Phil Silvers as himself

References

External links 
 

1944 films
20th Century Fox films
American drama films
1944 drama films
Films directed by Benjamin Stoloff
American black-and-white films
1940s English-language films
1940s American films